

Sandilands is a locality in the Australian state of  South Australia located on the east coast of Yorke Peninsula immediately adjoining Gulf St Vincent about  north-west of the state capital of Adelaide and about  south-east of the municipal seat in Maitland.

Its boundaries which were created in May 1999 for the “long established name.” The locality's name is derived from Robert Hamilton Sandilands (1841-1923) who lived there during the 1880s.

As of 2014, the majority land use within the locality is “primary production.”

Sandilands is located within the federal division of Grey, the state electoral district of Narungga and the local government area of the Yorke Peninsula Council.

References

Towns in South Australia
Yorke Peninsula